Carl Ivar Gustafsson (born 18 March 2000) is a Swedish football midfielder who plays for Kalmar FF.

Career 
Gustafsson made his full international debut for Sweden on 9 January 2023, replacing Samuel Gustafson 82 minutes into a friendly 2–0 win against Finland.

Career statistics

International

References

2000 births
Living people
Swedish footballers
Sweden international footballers
Sweden youth international footballers
Association football midfielders
Kalmar FF players
Allsvenskan players